These are the results for the boys' 69 kg event at the 2018 Summer Youth Olympics.

Results

References
 Results 

Weightlifting at the 2018 Summer Youth Olympics